The Myth of the Andalusian Paradise is a non-fiction book written by Dario Fernández-Morera and published by ICI Books in 2016. In it, the author argues against La Convivencia, the hypothesis that the Spanish Islamic realms (Al-Andalus) were religiously tolerant.

Background and contents
Fernández-Morera is a Cuban-born associate professor at Northwestern University in the United States, specialising in the literature of Miguel Cervantes. ICI Books is the publishing arm of the Intercollegiate Studies Institute, an American conservative think tank.

The author believes that left-wing academics, journalists and politicians misrepresent the tolerance in Al-Andalus to promote their own agendas in modern times. He argues that the Umayyad conquest of Hispania destroyed Visigothic Spain when it was flourishing culturally. He mentions the important role of slavery in the economy of Al-Andalus, as well as the jizya tax taken from Christians and Jews as part of their dhimmi minority status that was higher than the equivalent zakat tax for Muslims. He details the persecution of religious minorities under the later Almohad and Almoravid dynasties, such as the Almohad emir Abu Yusuf who is said to have boasted that he had destroyed every church and synagogue in his realm.

Reception
Trevor J. Dadson called the book "a definite must-read for anyone interested in medieval Spain". Alberto Ferreiro also gave the work a positive review, expressing a desire for a Spanish translation.

Maribel Fierro finds that Fernández-Morera often "lacks first-hand knowledge of his subject matter and has misinterpreted his readings" and his book is "will not lead to a better understanding of al-Andalus" but is "useful in understanding how al-Andalus is employed to fight the battles of the present".

David F. Forte, a professor of law at Cleveland State University, wrote that the level of research for the book was "prodigious", but its organisation was poor and it "veers between genuine scholarship, pedantry, and advocacy". He noted some double standards in Fernández-Morera's argument: the Visigoths were praised for borrowing from their Roman predecessors, while the Muslims are chastised for doing the same; the book similarly mentions the Muslims' roles in the slave trade in Iberia and Africa, but not how the Christian Spaniards were involved in the same practices. Forte writes that the best research in the book is on how Iberian Christians and Jews dealt with internal rifts in the same era; the Jews against the Karaite sect and the Christians against Arianism.

S. J. Pearce, an associate professor of Spanish and Portuguese at New York University and specialist on medieval Spain, wrote a scathing review of the book. She wrote that "The Myths myth is a myth", accusing Fernández-Morera of constructing a straw man argument of medieval Islamic tolerance that is not the modern academic consensus, as well as "It would be a book-length corrective that would address and properly contextualize and source all of the errors that occur at every level in The Myth". She repeated her criticism in a 44-page chapter in The Extreme Right and the Revision of History.

External links 
 Darío Fernández-Morera: The Myth of the Andalusian Paradise  (article from 2006)

References
General
 
 

Specific

2016 non-fiction books
History books about Spain
Books about Islam and society
Books about antisemitism
Books critical of Islam